Khutkhul is a rural locality (a selo) and the administrative centre of Khutkhulsky Selsoviet, Agulsky District, Republic of Dagestan, Russia. The population was 628 as of 2010.

Geography 
Khutkhul is located on the Chiragchay River, 3 km east of Tpig (the district's administrative centre) by road. Tpig is the nearest rural locality.

References 

Rural localities in Agulsky District